In the Midst of Lions was an American deathcore band from St. Louis, Missouri. They have three full-length album releases: Out Of Darkness, The Heart of Man and Shadows. The name of the band pertains to a biblical scripture in Psalms 57:4.

Biography
In the Midst of Lions originated from the St. Louis music scene. After the success of their debut album, Out Of Darkness on Strike First Records, the band signed to Facedown Records where they released The Heart of Man. This album reached No. 30 on the Billboard Heatseekers chart.

They headlined a tour with bands such as This or the Apocalypse, Your Memorial, and No Bragging Rights. They also appeared on the Over the Limit Tour with Bury Your Dead, Evergreen Terrace, Thick as Blood, along with other acts. The band released its third studio album on Facedown Records, entitled Shadows, on November 22, 2011. This album peaked at No. 12 on the Billboard Heatseekers chart.

In 2011, the band broke up. The band issued a statement regarding the breakup:

Members
Last Known Lineup
Ryan McAllister – lead guitar (2009–2012, 2017) (currently in GOGA)
Alex Livingston – drums (2009–2012, 2017)
Matt Janssen – vocals (2009-2012, 2017)
Sam Penner – rhythm guitar (2009-2012, 2017) (formerly of For Today, formerly of The Devil Wears Prada live, Memphis May Fire)
Jake Mitchell – bass (2009-2012, 2017)

Former
Lance Bettis - rhythm guitar (2009)
Louis Probst - bass (2009)

Studio albums

References

External links
 Artist profile at Facedown Records
 In the Midst of Lions at Facebook
 In the Midst of Lions at MySpace

American Christian metal musical groups
Musical groups from St. Louis
Musical groups established in 2009
American deathcore musical groups